Scott Penny (born 22 September 1999) is an Irish rugby union player for Leinster. His preferred position is openside flanker.

Early life
Penny attended  St Michael's College, where he starred on several cup rugby teams.

Leinster
After leaving school in June 2018 he immediately entered the Leinster Rugby academy at the age of 18. While still in his first year in the academy Penny scored eight tries in seven games for Leinster 'A' in their victorious Celtic Cup campaign. This rake of tries, highly unusual for a forward, included a hat-trick against the Ospreys development team in a man-of-the-match performance.

Less than two months after turning 19 Penny made his Leinster senior debut against Ospreys in November 2018, capping a strong performance with a try. Due to his involvement with Leinster 'A' during the Celtic Cup, Penny made his debut for the Leinster senior team before playing for UCD in the All-Ireland League or even for the Ireland u-20s. His second Leinster appearance followed against Dragons, where he again scored a try and showed deceptive power for his relatively small size and young age throughout. He was named the Pro14 Next-Gen Star of the Season for the 2020–21 Pro14 season. His strong performance in the 2020–21 Championship, also earned him his first spot on the Pro14 Dream Team.

Honours

Leinster
Pro14: 3 (2019, 2020, 2021)

Leinster 'A'
Celtic Cup: 2 (2019, 2020)

Ireland Under-20s
Six Nations Under 20s Championship: 1 (2019)
Grand Slam: 1 (2019)
Triple Crown: 1 (2019)

Individual
Pro14 Young Player of the Year: 1 (2021)
Pro14 Team of the Season: 1 (2021)
Pro14 Top Try Scorer: 1 (2021)

References

External links
Leinster profile
Ireland U20 profile
Pro14 profile

1999 births
Living people
People educated at St Michael's College, Dublin
Rugby union players from Dublin (city)
University College Dublin R.F.C. players
Irish rugby union players
Leinster Rugby players
Rugby union flankers